Ray Goossens (14 August 1924 – 10 December 1998) was a Belgian artist, animator, writer, and director best known for creating the cartoon character Musti.

Biography
Ray Goossens was born in Merksem, Belgium in 1924. Interested in animation from before World War II, he founded the AFIM animation studios with Henri Winkeler and Edmond Roex in 1940. They had 15 employees, including later famous comics artists like Bob de Moor and Jef Nys. They created a number of short animated movies, of which Smidje Smee was the most successful.

After the war, Goossens started working as a comics creator with Kleine Zondagsvriend, a weekly youth magazine. He created a number of series, some based on existing stories like Tijl Uilenspiegel and Reinaert de Vos, some new like Tsjoem (a parrot) and Snops en de bende. He also worked as an illustrator for different newspapers and magazines, including Gazet van Antwerpen.

He worked as an animator mainly for client's publicity purposes, and in 1957 became artistic director of Belvision, the new animation studios of Le Lombard, one of the major Belgian comics publishers. At first, they created series based on existing comics series like Oumpah-pah, Hergé's Adventures of Tintin or Chlorophylle. They also made the full-length movie Pinocchio in Outer Space.

From 1956 to 1969 he worked as an independent animator and director. In 1967 he directed Asterix the Gaul, the first feature film based on this comic, and in 1968 he joined Dupuis, where he created with the animation studios a number of children's series like Tip en Tap, De Pili's and Musti. He also directed a series based on the adventures of Boule et Bill.

From 1976 onwards, Ray Goossens taught animation at the R.I.T.C.S in Brussels. His final success as a director followed in 1980, with Plons de gekke kikker.

Ray Goossens died in 1998 in Deurne.

Filmography

As director

With AFIM
1940: Metamorfose, Rapi Roum, and Hoe primmeke ter wereld kwam
1941: Smidje Smee
1947: De lamme maakt een ritje

Independent work
1956: Wat 'n vader
1958: Paviljoen Wetenschappen for the Expo 58 (Brussels World's Fair)
1959: Van zilverzout tot zilverbeeld
1960: Van katoenbol tot filmonderlaag
1967: In naam der wet
1968: Hoera, ik ben vader!, and Er was eens

With Belvision Studios
1957-1964: Hergé's Adventures of Tintin
1960: Le bosquet hanté
1961: Boothill Mc Gall, sheriff and Coin-coin
1964: Canard à l'orange
1965: Spaghetti à la romaine, Oumpah-Pah, and Pinocchio in Outer Space
1967: Asterix the Gaul

With Dupuis
1968-1982: Musti (52 episodes of 5 minutes)
1971: Tip en Tap
1973: De Pili's
1975: Boule et Bill, and Bobo
1984: Trompo

With VRT
1990-1991: Musti (104 all-new episodes)

As writer
1983-1991: Plons de gekke kikker

Awards
1956: First prize at the second Festival of the Belgian Movie, for Wat 'n vader

References

External links
Biography at Lambiek's Comiclopedia (focuses on his comics work)
Biography in Dutch at Filmhuis Klappei (focuses on his animation)

1924 births
1998 deaths
Flemish people
Belgian animators
Belgian film directors
Belgian film producers
Belgian animated film directors
Belgian animated film producers
20th-century Belgian writers
Belgian comics artists
Belgian children's book illustrators
Belgian illustrators
People from Merksem